E-social science is a more recent development in conjunction with the wider developments in e-science. It is social science using grid computing and other information technologies to collect, process, integrate, share, and disseminate social and behavioural data.

External links
UK National Centre for e-Social Science Web Home Page
National Centre for e-Social Science
Oxford e-Social Science This project has focused on the ethical, legal and institutional factors shaping e-Science.
ReDReSS project This site provides resources for social scientists interested in using e-Social Science and e-Science tools and methodologies.
Collaboratory for Quantitative e-Social Science  
Chinese e-Social Science

E-Science
Cyberinfrastructure